Uranium hexoxide is an unusual, theoretically possible compound of uranium in which the uranium atom would be attached to six oxygen atoms. It would be an unprecedented example of an element in the +12 oxidation state; for comparison, the highest known oxidation state is +9 for iridium in the cation .

Structure
Uranium hexoxide is predicted to have octahedral symmetry; however, other forms have been studied. In  the 1Oh the oxygen atoms are oxide ions (O2−). In the 1D3 form there are three peroxide ions. The 3D2h form  has two oxo oxygens and two pairs of superoxide.

References

Hypothetical chemical compounds
Uranium compounds
Oxides